Oldest capital derby or Oldest Sofia derby is the name of the football match between the oldest still existing teams in the capital of Bulgaria: Slavia Sofia and Levski Sofia. Matches between the two sides have been played almost continuously ever since a football league in Bulgaria has existed. The two teams regularly competed for the title before World War II. Levski have never been relegated from the top flight, while Slavia have missed only one season, for political reasons. This is the most played match in Bulgarian football.

History 
Slavia and Levski are the two oldest, still-existing football teams from Sofia. Both teams won the Bulgarian Republican Championship several times prior to the Second World War. Slavia managed to win six national titles before 1945, while Levski won three national titles, and one Bulgarian Cup.

The two teams are also among the most successful when it comes to the Bulgarian Cup. Levski has won a record 26, while Slavia has won 8. They have also played against each other twice in the finals of the competition. The first final between them occurred in 1996. The match did not even finish, with Slavia being awarded a walkover in their favor, due to Levski deciding to abandon the game in the 75th minute. 22 years later, the two sides again met in the final, in 2018. The game ended in a goalless draw, after which Slavia won on penalties, thus winning their eight title overall. In 2021, the two rivals met again in the quarter-finals of the tournament, with Slavia winning once again by the score of 2–1. However, Levski is the dominant force in this rivalry, historically.

Official match statistics

Head-to-head ranking in First League (1948–2022)

• Total: Slavia Sofia with 12 higher finishes, Levski Sofia with 61 higher finishes (as of the end of the 2021–22 season).

Trophies

Notes:
 Bulgarian Cup section includes Soviet Army Cup as major Cup tournament.
 Soviet Army Cup section includes the period after 1982 as secondary Cup tournament.
 People's Republic of Bulgaria Cup section includes the period before 1982 as secondary Cup tournament.
 Italics indicates defunct tournaments.

Statistics

Biggest wins

Slavia wins
4–1 - 1925/1926; 1931/1932; 26 October 1958; 24 March 1990

Levski wins
5–0 - 1941/1942; 28 October 2005

Notes:
 Slavia walkover win with 4:0 in 1996 Bulgarian Cup Final is not included.

References

External links
Bulgaria Cups Overview - Bulgarian Cups, RSSSF.com
Levski vs other teams full statistics - Bulgarian tournaments, levskisofia.info

Football derbies in Bulgaria
PFC Levski Sofia
PFC Slavia Sofia